Zoran Radosavljević (Serbian Cyrillic: Зоран Радосављевић; born 4 July 1968) is a retired footballer who played as a midfielder.

Club career
Born in Sušica, Kragujevac, Radosavljević began playing football with local side FK Radnički Kragujevac. He would later play in the Yugoslav First League for Red Star Belgrade and the Serbian SuperLiga with FK Javor Ivanjica, but spent most of his career with Radnički. He won the 1997 Yugoslav Cup with Red Star.

Radosavljević moved to Greece in December 1997, joining Greek second division side Panargiakos F.C. for the second half of the 1997–98 season. He made his league debut against Trikala in January 1998, but after just six months with the club, he returned to Serbia and Radnički Kragujevac. Next, he joined FK Javor Ivanjica for five seasons and finished his career after one more season with Radnički Kragujevac. He retired in 2008.

References

External links
 Profile at Strukljeva.net

1968 births
Living people
Yugoslav footballers
Serbian footballers
Association football midfielders
FK Radnički 1923 players
Red Star Belgrade footballers
FK Javor Ivanjica players
Panargiakos F.C. players
Expatriate footballers in Greece